Perigonia ilus is a moth of the family Sphingidae first described by Jean Baptiste Boisduval in 1870.

Distribution 
It is known from Mexico, Honduras, Costa Rica, Belize, Guatemala, El Salvador, Nicaragua, Panama, Colombia, Venezuela, Ecuador, Peru, Bolivia, Argentina, Paraguay, Brazil  and Uruguay.

Description 
The wingspan is 54–58 mm. It is similar to Perigonia lusca lusca, but can be distinguished by the yellow tornal area of the hindwing underside.

Biology 
Adults are on wing year round.

The larvae have been recorded feeding on Calycophyllum candidissimum, Guettarda macrosperma and Ilex paraguariensis. They are green with a yellow tail horn and a dark blue stripe down the back. There are several colour morphs.

References

Perigonia
Moths described in 1870